Dance Without Music is a 1947 thriller novel by the British writer Peter Cheyney. While Cheyney had gained his reputation with series about two celebrated characters Lemmy Caution and Slim Callaghan, he also wrote several popular stand-alone novels about hardboiled private detectives such as this. It was serialised in Britain by The News of the World. In the United States it was published by Dodd Mead in 1948.

Synopsis
Private detective Caryl Wylde O’Hara becomes drawn into a case involving a man and his heroin-addicted wife.

References

Bibliography
 Reilly, John M. Twentieth Century Crime & Mystery Writers. Springer, 2015.

1947 British novels
Novels by Peter Cheyney
British thriller novels
British crime novels
Novels set in London
William Collins, Sons books